Richard Verderber (January 23, 1884 – September 8, 1955) was an Austrian fencer who competed in the 1912 Summer Olympics.

He was part of the Austrian sabre team, which won the silver medal. In the individual foil event he won the bronze medal.

Military ranks
Kadett-Offiziersstellvertreter:  1 September 1902
Leutnant:  1 November 1903
Hauptmann:  1 January 1915
Major:  1 January 1920
Oberstlieutenant:  January 1929
Oberst:  15 March 1934

Decorations and honors
 Austrian Merit Order in Bronze and Silver
 Order of the Iron Crown
 Military Merit Cross
 Karl Troop Cross

References

External links
Richard Verderber's profile on databaseolympics.com

1884 births
1955 deaths
People from Kočevje
Austrian male foil fencers
Austrian male sabre fencers
Olympic fencers of Austria
Fencers at the 1912 Summer Olympics
Olympic silver medalists for Austria
Olympic bronze medalists for Austria
Olympic medalists in fencing
Medalists at the 1912 Summer Olympics
Theresian Military Academy alumni